The 2012 Sana'a bombing was a suicide attack on 21 May 2012, against Yemeni Army soldiers practicing for the annual Unity Day military parade in Sana'a, Yemen. The ceremony is carried out every year on 22 May since 1990 to mark the unification of North Yemen and South Yemen as the Republic of Yemen. Responsibility for the attack was claimed by the Al Qaeda in the Arabian Peninsula (AQAP) affiliate Ansar al-Sharia.

Background 
The suicide bombing came 10 days into an army offensive against al-Qaeda in Yemen's restive southern Abyan province, where the AQAP (Al-Qaeda in the Arabian Peninsula) have seized control of a string of towns and cities in attacks launched since May 2011. According to witnesses and Yemeni officials, the Yemeni government had intensified its offensive against Al Qaeda in southern Yemen in the week prior to the attack with combined air and ground assaults leaving dozens of casualties, among them civilians. It also follows suspected U.S. drone bombings in Yemen, which AQAP said the attack was in retaliation for and, at the same time, AQAP have used instability over the 2011-2012 Yemeni uprising to take control of swathes of southern Yemen.

Attack 
The attack took place in al-Sabin Square, near Yemen's presidential palace, as soldiers were arranging themselves in a parade rehearsal for the upcoming Unity Day ceremonies. According to Yemeni security officials, the bomber was a rogue soldier participating in the drill wearing a belt of explosives. Early reports suggested a few dozen casualties, but by the early afternoon the confirmed death toll was at 90, with at least 222 injured. Security officials stated that the attacker had detonated his explosives shortly before Defence Minister Muhammad Nasir Ahmad Ali and the army chief-of-staff were expected to greet the troops. The attack resulted in "horrific carnage", with one witness describing "arms and legs scattered on the ground ... The wounded people were piled on top of each other, covered with blood." Another soldier who had been present for the attack called it a "massacre", stating "I have never seen such a bloody day in my life". Al-Arabiya reported on 96 dead and over 300 injured in the blast. Later in the day the casualty toll was raised yet again, this time to over 120 killed and nearly 350 injured, some of them critically.

A doctor at a Sana'a hospital described the city's medical facilities as overwhelmed, and stated that the attack had left dozens paralyzed. Most of the casualties appeared to be from the Central Security Organisation – a large paramilitary force commanded by Yahya Saleh, a nephew of former President Ali Abdullah Saleh. Within hours of the attack, Saleh was dismissed from his post by presidential decree.

Perpetrators 
Al-Qaeda in the Arabian Peninsula's-affiliate Ansar al-Sharia claimed responsibility for the attack a few hours after it had taken place. A spokesman for the group said it was in retaliation for injustices done by the CSO: "We will take revenge, God willing, and the flames of war will reach you everywhere, and what happened is but the start of a jihad project in defence of honour and sanctities." It also added that there would be more attacks if the government assault did not stop in Abyan.

Reactions 
President Abdrabu Mansur Hadi stated that the attackers "wanted to turn the joy of our people with the unity day into sorrow ... and therefore, the war on terrorism will continue till it is uprooted and defeated completely whatever the sacrifices are". State-run Saba News Agency condemned the bombing as a terrorist attack, showing "a moral and religious perversion of the attackers and plotters".

United Nations Secretary General Ban Ki-moon condemned the attack and called for those involved to be brought to justice. He also urged the people of Yemen to fully implement the negotiated political transition that had replaced the administration of President Saleh with that of Hadi following the 2011–2012 Yemeni revolution.

The U.K. Foreign Office Minister Alistair Burt strongly condemned the attack, calling it 'cowardly'. He added that "this tragic event underlines the scale of the security challenge facing the Yemeni government as it seeks to introduce key reforms and work towards completing political transition". The White House issued a statement as well, condemning the bombing and offering to help Yemen with the investigation. US President Barack Obama also expressed concerns that Yemen was becoming a "hub" for terrorism. French President François Hollande described the attack as "barbaric".

The Somali Islamic militant group Al-Shabaab congratulated Al-Qaeda on the successful attack through its official Twitter account.

Aftermath 
The Unity Day parade was held on schedule the following day, with President Hadi watching from behind a bulletproof barrier. On 24 May, a suicide bomber killed 12 people when he drove his car into a crowd supporting Shi'ite rebels, who Al Qaeda considers "renegade Muslims". Another suicide bomber attempted to attack a protest on the same day, but his belt killed only himself.

References 

2012 murders in Yemen
Explosions in 2012
Sana'a
Islamic terrorist incidents in 2012
Terrorist incidents in Yemen in 2012
21st century in Sanaa
Suicide bombings in Yemen
Terrorist incidents attributed to al-Qaeda in the Arabian Peninsula
Crime in Sanaa
May 2012 events in Asia